General Waqo Gutu Usu  (1924 – 3 February 2006)  was an Ethiopian rebel and leader of one of the earlier Oromo resistance fighter movements; the Bale Revolt, which in the 1960s had fought against the feudalistic system in place in the Ethiopian Empire. He was elected chairman of the United Liberation Forces of Oromia in 2000. In 2006, Gutu died in a Nairobi hospital, survived by 20 sons and 17 daughters.

Life

Little is known about his early schooling or ideological basis for his rebellion against Emperor Haile Selassie and the regimes that followed the monarch's ouster and murder. Assessments of Waqo Gutu vary greatly over his role as "founder" of Oromo separatism. However, waqo gutu was motivated by his granduncle Mohamed gada qallu last qallu of the raitu clan in dallo now known as Delo mena and Meda welabu districts in bale modern day Oromia. Mohamed gada converted to Islam in 1930's and made alliance with his raitu clansmen in eastern bale and Somali clans fought in the jeegir war and led guerilla attacks on the Ethiopian state in dallo awraja was captured and before he was assassinated in prison he gave waqo gutu Qubee Meetaa a ring for Qallu's and the story of this handover is clearly meant to signify Waqo Gutu's and the subsequent rebellion's intrinsic linkage to core Oromo values.

Waqo Gutu role in starting the Bale Revolt started because when the borana and guji oromo clans in borena zone attacked the Somali clans and the Arsi raitu clan in negele borana who were armed by haile selassie government. when the government came they did help and told waqo gutu's clan and other Somali clans living there go back to Somalia where they belong. while in borena waqo gutu made contacts with an agent for the Somali government who told mogadisho was providing guns for rebels to fight the Ethiopian state. waqo gutu, haji isaaq daadhi of raitu clan in wabe shebale,hassan goro and chief of the aulihan ogaden taqane farah went to mogadisho had a conference. a new group was formed known as Somali abbo led by waqo gutu and the fighters were from Arsi oromo and Garre Somali background.

Waqo gutu caused damage to the Ethiopian state that Haile selassie had to get help from other nations.

In 2000 he formed the ULFO to unite the disparate armed and political groups fighting for the right to self-determination of the Oromo, and led as chairman from 2002 until he was taken ill and flown to Nairobi where he died after three months' hospitalisation. He was buried 11 February in his birthplace in the Bale Zone.

References

2006 deaths
Ethiopian military personnel
Oromo people
1924 births
People of the Ethiopian Civil War